The 2013 Supercopa de España was a two-legged Spanish football match-up that was played in August 2013 between the champions of 2012–13 La Liga, Barcelona, and the winner of the 2012–13 Copa del Rey, Atlético Madrid.

In the first leg which was played on 21 August in Madrid, former Barcelona striker David Villa put Atlético Madrid ahead when he hit a right-footed volley into the back of the net after a cross from the left after 12 minutes. Barcelona equalized in the 66th minute when substitute Neymar headed in at the far post after a high cross by Dani Alves from the right.

In the second leg, played on 28 August at the Camp Nou, Lionel Messi missed a penalty for Barcelona in the 89th minute, hitting his shot against the crossbar after Miranda had bundled substitute Pedro over in the area. Atlético Madrid had two players sent off: Filipe Luís in the 81st minute for tangling with Dani Alves, and Arda Turan, who had already been substituted, in the first minute of added time for protesting a decision.
Barcelona won the cup for a record 11th time on the away goals rule.

Match details

First leg

Second leg

See also
2013–14 Atlético Madrid season
2013–14 FC Barcelona season

References

2013–14 in Spanish football cups
Atlético Madrid matches
FC Barcelona matches
2013